Jodie Kenny (née Schulz; born 18 August 1987) is an Australian field hockey player.

Kenny was a member of the Australia women's national field hockey team that were defeated by the Netherlands women's national field hockey team in the final of the 2014 Women's Hockey World Cup. She was a member of the Australian team that defeated England in the women's field hockey final at the 2014 Commonwealth Games, scoring a goal in the last minute of regular time that took the match into a penalty shoot-out. She plays for the Queensland Scorchers in the Australian Hockey League.

Personal
Schulz was born in Redcliffe, and is from Queensland.  , she lives in Perth, Western Australia. She attended Wamuran State Primary School before going to St Columbans College.  She started working on a Bachelor Sport and Exercise Science at the University of Sunshine Coast in 2007 and was still enrolled in 2012. She was named the Sunshine Coast Sport Star of the Year senior monthly winner for April 2012.

Jodie married Shane Kenny, a fellow hockey player, in December 2013, changing her surname from Schulz to Kenny.

Field hockey
Schulz has held field hockey scholarships with the Australian Institute of Sport and the Queensland Academy of Sport.

She plays for the Queensland Scorchers in the Australian Hockey League, making her debut in 2009.

National team
When the Hockeyroos got new coach Adam Commens in January 2011, Schulz was one of four players identified for to aide in developing the national side. In 2011, she made her senior national team debut at the Four Nations Tournament in Argentina, scoring two goals in her first game. Later in the year, in October, she was the national team captain during two games against China. In June 2012, she played in the Investec London Cup. In the 4–1 win against Ireland in the lead up London, she scored the team's third goal. , she had 43 caps with the Hockeyroos.

Schulz was named to the Australia women's national field hockey squad that will compete at the 2012 Summer Olympics, where she made her debut as a 24-year-old, one year after making her senior national team debut.

Jodie was a key part of the Hockeyroos' success in 2014, winning the Hockeyroos World Cup Player of the Year award, as well as the top scorer award with 29 goals. To date Jodie has scored 88 goals from 144 caps, while playing as a defender. Her pump up songs before matches are Daryl Braithwaite's The Horses and Tom Petty's I Won't Back Down.

She was the Hockeyroos's top scorer in 2014 and 2015, winning Hockeyroos player of the year in 2015.

At the 2016 Summer Olympics, she scored her 100th goal for Australia.

In 2016 after the Rio Olympics, she announced she was taking a break from the sport.

References

External links
 
 
 
 

Living people
1987 births
Australian female field hockey players
Sportswomen from Queensland
Field hockey people from Queensland
Field hockey players at the 2014 Commonwealth Games
Field hockey players at the 2016 Summer Olympics
Olympic field hockey players of Australia
Commonwealth Games medallists in field hockey
Commonwealth Games gold medallists for Australia
Female field hockey defenders
21st-century Australian women
Medallists at the 2014 Commonwealth Games